Jeffrey E. Faulkner (born April 4, 1964) is a former American football defensive lineman in the National Football League for the Kansas City Chiefs, Indianapolis Colts, Phoenix Cardinals, New Orleans Saints, Washington Redskins, and the New York Jets. He also played in the Arena Football League for the Chicago Bruisers, Orlando Predators and the Milwaukee Mustangs. He played college football at Southern University. He is distinguished as being the first Virgin Islander and St. Thomian to play in the National Football League.

External links
Just Sports Stats

1964 births
Living people
People from Saint Thomas, U.S. Virgin Islands
United States Virgin Islands players of American football
American football defensive ends
American football defensive tackles
Southern Jaguars football players
Kansas City Chiefs players
Indianapolis Colts players
Phoenix Cardinals players
New Orleans Saints players
Washington Redskins players
New York Jets players
Chicago Bruisers players
Orlando Predators players
Milwaukee Mustangs (1994–2001) players
National Football League replacement players